is a passenger railway station located in the city of Kasukabe, Saitama, Japan, operated by the private railway operator Tōbu Railway.

Line
The station is served by the Tōbu Skytree Line, and is 33.0 kilometers from the terminus of the line at Asakusa Station.

Station layout
The station has two opposed side platforms serving two tracks, connected to the station building by a footbridge.

Platforms

Adjacent stations

History
Ichinowari Station opened on 1 October 1926. From 17 March 2012, station numbering was introduced on all Tōbu lines, with Ichinowari Station becoming "TS-26".

Passenger statistics
In fiscal 2019, the station was used by an average of 18,063 passengers daily.

Surrounding area
 Kasukabe Chuo General Hospital

References

External links

 Tobu Station information 

Railway stations in Japan opened in 1926
Tobu Skytree Line
Stations of Tobu Railway
Railway stations in Saitama Prefecture
Kasukabe, Saitama